Daniel Ek (born 21 February 1983) is a Swedish billionaire entrepreneur and technologist. He is the co-founder and CEO of music streaming service Spotify.

Early life and education
Ek grew up in the Rågsved district of Stockholm, Sweden. He graduated from high school in IT-Gymnasiet in Sundbyberg in 2002, and subsequently studied engineering at the KTH Royal Institute of Technology, before dropping out to focus on his IT career.

Business career

Career

Ek served in a senior role at Nordic auction company Tradera which was acquired by eBay in 2006. Ek also served as the CTO of the browser-based game and fashion community Stardoll. Ek later started another company Advertigo, an online advertising company. Advertigo was sold to TradeDoubler in 2006. After selling Advertigo, Ek briefly became the CEO of μTorrent, working with μTorrent founder Ludvig Strigeus. This ended when μTorrent was sold to BitTorrent on December 7, 2006. Strigeus would later join Ek as a Spotify developer.

Spotify
The sale of Advertigo as well as his previous work made Ek wealthy enough that he decided to retire. However, after a few months, he realized he wanted a new project, leading to his founding Spotify. Ek first had the idea for Spotify in 2002 when peer-to-peer music service Napster shut down and another illegal site Kazaa took over. Ek said he "realized that you can never legislate away from piracy. Laws can definitely help, but it doesn't take away the problem. The only way to solve the problem was to create a service that was better than piracy and at the same time compensates the music industry – that gave us Spotify."

Ek incorporated Spotify AB with Martin Lorentzon in Stockholm, Sweden in 2006. Lorentzon had previously worked at and co-founded TradeDoubler which had acquired Ek's previous company Advertigo. In October 2008, the company launched its legal music streaming service Spotify. Initially, Spotify ran on a peer-to-peer distribution model, similar to μTorrent, but switched to a server-client model in 2014. Ek serves as CEO of Spotify. In October 2015, Spotify co-founder Martin Lorentzon announced he would be stepping down as chairman and Ek would be taking over alongside his current role as CEO. As of April 2019, Spotify has 217 million active users and as of June 2017 had raised over $2.5 billion in venture funding.

In 2017, Ek was named the most powerful person in the music industry by Billboard.

In May 2022, Ek invested an additional $50 million to acquire more Spotify shares, citing an optimistic future outlook for the streaming giant. Spotify at that time had 182 million paying subscribers and was growing at 15% year on year.

Political positions
In 2016, Ek and fellow Spotify co-founder Martin Lorentzon wrote an open letter on the blogging platform Medium to the Swedish government saying that if certain changes to Swedish law regarding housing, taxation, and education are not made, Spotify will be forced to relocate from the country. More specifically, Ek claims that the high taxes in Sweden on stock options makes it difficult to incentivize programmers to work at startups when startups have trouble competing with larger companies on salary. Moreover, Ek claims the Swedish permitting policy is overly restrictive, limiting the supply of affordable housing.

Personal life
In 2016, Ek married Sofia Levander, his longtime partner, at Lake Como. At Ek's wedding, Bruno Mars was invited to perform and Chris Rock officiated; he invited numerous guests, including Mark Zuckerberg. Ek and his wife have two children together.

Ek is a lifelong supporter of Premier League club Arsenal, and, in April 2021, expressed an interest in purchasing the football club if it were put up for sale. In May 2021, Ek made an offer to buy the club for approximately £1.8 billion, which was rejected by the owners.

References

Living people
21st-century Swedish businesspeople
1983 births
Swedish billionaires
Swedish technology company founders
KTH Royal Institute of Technology alumni
Spotify people
Businesspeople from Stockholm